The Bogota Independent Film Festival, or IndieBo, is a showcase of Colombian and international film held in Bogota, Colombia. It was founded in September 2014.

References 

Film festivals in Colombia